Pacem in terris, Op. 404 is a choral symphony for alto, baritone, chorus and orchestra by French composer Darius Milhaud. Though often identified only by its title and opus number, it is considered Milhaud's thirteenth and last symphony. The piece was written in 1963, incorporating text written by Pope John XXIII. At least a partial recording of this symphony is available on the Musique En Wallonie label, featuring the Brussels Belgian Radio and TV Philharmonic Orchestra conducted by Franz André.

References

External links 
Video - Darius Milhaud - Pacem in terris (49:46).

Symphonies by Darius Milhaud
Choral symphonies
1963 compositions